A temenos (plural: , temenē) is a piece of land cut off and assigned as an official domain, especially to kings and chiefs, or a piece of land marked off from common uses and dedicated to a god, such as a sanctuary, holy grove, or holy precinct.

A temenos enclosed a sacred space called a hieron. It was usually surrounded by a wall, ditch, or line of stones. All things inside of the demarkated area belonged to the designated god. Greeks could find asylum within a sanctuary and be under the protection of the deity and could not be moved against their will.

Etymology
The word derives from the Greek verb  (temnō), "I cut". The earliest attested form of the word is the Mycenaean Greek , te-me-no, written in Linear B syllabic script.

The Latin language equivalent was fanum.

In religious discourse in English, temenos has also come to refer to a territory, plane, receptacle or field of deity or divinity.

Examples
 The race-course of the Pythian Games is called a temenos.

 A large example of a Bronze Age Minoan temenos is at the Juktas Sanctuary of the palace of Knossos on ancient Crete in present-day Greece, the temple having a massive northern temenos.

 Another example is at Olympia, the temenos of Zeus.

 There were temene dedicated to Apollo in many places, as he was a patron god of settlers.

 There is a Temenos area in the Romano-British temple complex of the Roman town of Caerwent in Wales

Historical development
The concept of temenos arose in classical antiquity as an area reserved for worship of the gods. Some authors have used the term to apply to a sacred grove of trees, isolated from everyday living spaces, while other usage points to areas within ancient urban development that are parts of sanctuaries.

A temenos is often physically marked by a peribolos fence or wall (e.g. Delphi) as a structural boundary.

Originally, the peribolos was often just a set of marker stones demarcating the boundary, or a light fence. The earliest sanctuaries appear to have begun as a peribolos around a sacred grove, spring, cave, or other feature, with an altar but no temple or cult image. Later, as Greek sanctuaries became more elaborate, large stone walls with gateways or gatehouses were built around important sanctuaries, although the most famous, the Acropolis of Athens, had an elaborate enclosure because it began as a palace and military citadel and was converted into a sanctuary.

Psychological interpretation
Carl Jung relates the temenos to the spellbinding or magic circle, which acts as a "square space" where mental "work" can take place. This temenos resembles among others a "symmetrical rose garden with a fountain in the middle" in which an encounter with the unconscious can be had and where these unconscious contents can safely be brought into the light of consciousness. In this manner, one can meet one's own animus / anima, shadow, wise old wo/man (senex), and finally the self.

See also
 Bruniquel Cave
 Kiva
 Kshetra

Footnotes

References

Sources
 
 

Greek temples
Ancient Greek religion